Direct is a 1981 live in-studio album by Tower of Power. It was their only album for the direct-to-disc record label Sheffield Lab. It also marked the return of original guitarist Willie James Fulton, not heard from since 1972's Bump City, and the last album to feature saxophonist Lenny Pickett. Mark Sanders plays drums on this album. Between this album and their 1987 comeback album Power, they would record the sessions that later became the Dinosaur Tracks CD.  Besides that, save for the original single release of "Simple as That" (from the same Dinosaur Tracks sessions), this would be their last new release until 1987. It contained mostly songs from their previous albums, but included new material as well.

Direct would later be re-released with alternate takes on CD as Direct Plus! in 1997.

Track listing
Side One
 "Fanfare/And You Know It" (Greg Adams/Emilio Castillo, Stephen Kupka) originally recorded for Back on the Streets - 2:44
 "You're Gonna Need Me" (Albert King) New track - 4:02
 "Squib Cakes" (Chester Thompson) originally recorded for Back to Oakland - 7:34

Side Two
 "That's Why I Sing" (Chester Thompson) New track, later re-recorded during the Dinosaur Tracks sessions in 1983 - 4:57
 "What is Hip?" (Emilio Castillo, Stephen Kupka) originally recorded for Tower of Power - 4:40
 "Never Let Go of Love" (Greg Levias, Hilary Thompson, Michael Jeffries) New track, later re-recorded during the Dinosaur Tracks sessions in 1983 - 4:06

Personnel 
 Michael Jeffries – lead vocals
 Chester Thompson – keyboards, arrangements (3, 4)
 Willie Fulton – guitars, lead vocals (2)
 Vito San Filippo – bass
 Mark Sanders – drums
 Victor Feldman – percussion
 Lenny Pickett – alto saxophone, tenor saxophone, saxophone solo (3, 6)
 Emilio Castillo – tenor saxophone
 Stephen "Doc" Kupka – baritone saxophone
 Mic Gillette – trombone, trumpet, flugelhorn
 Greg Adams – trumpet, flugelhorn, arrangements (1, 5, 6), flugelhorn solo (3), trumpet solo (5)
 Rick Waychesko – trumpet
 Jim Gilstrap – guest singer
 Edie Lehmann – guest singer
 Oren Waters – guest singer

Production 
 Doug Sax – executive producer 
 Lincoln Mayorga – executive producer 
 Spencer Proffer – executive producer 
 Larry Brown – producer, recording
 Mike Sanders – assistant engineer 
 Tom Pessagno – technician
 Patricia Meredith – production coordinator 
 Dave McDonald – production manager 
 Tina Nichols – design, illustration 
 Miguel – photography 

Sheffield Lab credits
 Steve Haselton – chief engineer  
 Andrew Teton – field chief technician 
 Lincoln Mayorga – booth supervisor
 Dick Doss – disc processing 
 Rick Goldman – disc processing 
 Mike Reese – lathe operator
 Lois Walker – lathe operator
 Ed Hukoveh – lathe design

References 

1981 live albums
Tower of Power albums